Sergio Bagú (January 10, 1911 – December 2, 2002) was an Argentinian Marxist historian, sociologist and political philosopher.

Bagú, who was born in Buenos Aires, was a lecturer at the University of Illinois, Middlebury College and the University of Buenos Aires. As a university professor, he was exiled by the military junta in Argentina following the 1966 Argentine Revolution.  He died in Mexico City.

His most important book Economía de la sociedad colonial (The Economy of Colonial Society, 1949) was one of the first to challenge the idea of Latin American feudalism (dominant among the Communist parties of that time) and emphasize the capitalist dimension of the colonization of America.

References 

1911 births
2002 deaths
Academic staff of the University of Buenos Aires
20th-century Argentine historians
Argentine male writers
Argentine emigrants to Mexico
20th-century Argentine philosophers
Male non-fiction writers
Argentine expatriates in the United States